is a Japanese neologism used frequently in fictional works to describe any martial art style or fighting technique that has been developed with the purpose of killing an opponent. The term  is used interchangeably as well and the homophonous term  is used when the martial art style or technique explicitly revolves around swordsmanship rather than barehanded combat.

Examples in fiction 
The term ansatsuken has also been applied as well to other fighting styles in the series, particularly Nanto Seiken, Gento Kōken and Hokuto Ryūken (see list of fighting styles in Fist of the North Star).
 is a live-action feature film. Although Ansatsuken is a general term in Japanese, it has been used in the English language edition of Street Fighter: Eternal Challenge and other English-language Street Fighter media specifically as the name of Ryu and Kens fighting style which is heavily based on striking-based martial arts such as Karate and Kempo. Though not a mistranslation, it likely stems from a wrong understanding of the usage of the term when converted to the English media from the Japanese sources.
  used by El Gado in Final Fight Revenge.
 The  in Lunar: Eternal Blue.
  used by the Mysterious Warrior in the NES version of Double Dragon II: The Revenge. In Double Dragon Advance, this style is renamed  and its now used by a group called the Five Emperors.
 The Japanese language edition of Avenger!, the first book in the Way of the Tiger series, is titled .
 Kenichi: The Mightiest Disciple has "Satsujinken" as the main opposition to the protagonists. It's a principle followed by warriors who do not hold back in a fight and aim to kill their opponent, as they believe martial arts were created for this purpose.

See also
Touch of Death

References

 
Anime and manga terminology
Martial arts terminology